Tidewater refers to the north Atlantic Plain region of the United States.

Definition 
Culturally, the Tidewater region usually includes the low-lying plains of southeast Virginia, northeastern North Carolina, southern Maryland and the Chesapeake Bay. Speaking geographically, however, it covers about 50,000 square miles, from New York's Long Island in the north to the southernmost edge of North Carolina in the south, an area that includes the state of Delaware and the Delmarva Peninsula.

The cultural Tidewater region got its name from the effects of the changing tides on local rivers, sounds, and the ocean. The area has a centuries-old cultural heritage that sets the Tidewater region apart from the adjacent inland parts of the United States, especially with respect to its distinctive dialects of English, which are gradually disappearing, along with its islands and its receding shoreline.

Geography 

The tidewater region developed when sea level rose after the last ice age, resulting in the flooding of river valleys in the coastal plain. Such flooded river valleys now make up the tidewater since tides continue to affect water levels far inland, in some cases all the way west to the Fall Line. It is generally flat and low, with large expanses near the tidal shorelines composed of tidal marsh and swamp. Much of the area is covered with pocosin and the higher areas are used for agricultural farmlands. Geographically, in North Carolina and Virginia the Tidewater area is the land between the Suffolk Scarp and the Atlantic Ocean. In Maryland the Tidewater area is the flooded river areas below the Fall Line.  The Hampton Roads area of Virginia is considered to be  a Tidewater region.  Southern Maryland and the Eastern Shore, parts of Delaware round out the northern part of the region on the Chesapeake and Delaware Bays.

The term tidewater may be correctly applied to all portions of any area, including Virginia, where the water level is affected by the tides (more specifically, where the water level rises when the tide comes in). In the case of Virginia, the Tidewater region includes the land east of the Fall Line, the natural border with the Piedmont Region. It includes Hampton Roads, the rest of the Virginia Peninsula, the Middle Peninsula, the Northern Neck, and the Eastern Shore.

Planters in the early American colonies extended their tobacco and peanut productions above the Fall Line, where waterfalls or rapids mark the end of the Tidewater and the beginning of the foothill region known as the Piedmont.

Tidewater is host to flora commonly associated with the South Atlantic pine forests and lower Southeast Coastal Plain maritime flora, the latter found primarily in southeastern Virginia.

Regional accents
A distinctive non-rhotic accent of the Old South was spoken in the Tidewater coastal region of Virginia, best associated with upper-class white speakers of the 19th and early 20th centuries. In the actual islands of the Chesapeake themselves, a separate, rhotic accent survives among the locals, sometimes known as "Hoi Toider".

See also
 Hampton Roads
 Inner Banks
 Southern Maryland
 Eastern Shore (Maryland)
 Eastern Shore (Virginia)

References
Notes

Bibliography
 Colin Woodard: American Nations: A History of the Eleven Rival Regional Cultures in North America. 2011. 

Geography of Maryland
Geography of North Carolina
Geography of Virginia
Regions of Maryland
Regions of North Carolina
Regions of Virginia